Station keeping may refer to:
Orbital station-keeping, maneuvers used to keep a spacecraft in an assigned orbit
Nautical stationkeeping, maintaining a seagoing vessel in a position relative to other vessels or a fixed point